Shaun Ross may refer to:

Shaun Ross (musician), American bassist
Shaun Ross (model), American model